Suman Pawan Bodani is a Pakistani judge. She and Diana Kumari are the first Hindu women to become judges in Pakistan. She is currently serving in her native district Qambar Shahdadkot.

Career
Suman Kumari earned her master's degree in Law from the Shaheed Zulfikar Ali Bhutto Institute of Science and Technology University. She then worked for advocate Rasheed A. Razvi’s firm. In 2019, she passed the examination for induction of judicial officers and was appointed as a civil judge.

Personal life
Bodani lives in Qambar Shahdadkot District. Her father Dr. Pawan Kumar Bodani is an eye specialist. Her elder sister is a software engineer and another sister is a chartered accountant. Bodani is a fan of singers Lata Mangeshkar and Atif Aslam.

See also
Krishna Kohli
Pushpa Kumari Kohli
Veeru Kohli
Mahesh Kumar Malani
Rahul Dev
Hinduism in Pakistan

References

Hindu law jurists
Pakistani Hindus
Year of birth missing (living people)
Living people
Pakistani women judges